Space Raiders may refer to:
 Space Raiders (band), a British big beat/electronic band
 Space Raiders (film), a 1983 science fiction film
 Space Raiders (snack food), a British snack food brand
 Space Raiders (video game), a 2002 re-imagining of Space Invaders